Central Stadium may refer to:

Azerbaijan
Ujar Central Stadium, see list of football stadiums in Azerbaijan

Belarus
Central Stadium (Gomel)
Central Stadium (Rechitsa)

East Germany
Central Stadium (Leipzig, GDR)

Georgia
Central Stadium (Tbilisi)

India
Central Stadium (Thiruvananthapuram)

Kazakhstan
Central Stadium (Aktobe)
Almaty Central Stadium
Kostanay Central Stadium
Pavlodar Central Stadium
Taraz Central Stadium

Russia
Central Stadium (Astrakhan)
Central Stadium (Kazan)
Central Stadium (Krasnoyarsk)
Central Stadium (Murmansk)
Central Stadium (Oryol)
Central Stadium (Pyatigorsk)
Sochi Central Stadium
Central Stadium (Volgograd)
Central Stadium (Yekaterinburg)
Rashid Aushev Central Stadium, Nazran

Tajikistan
Central Stadium (Dushanbe)

Ukraine
Tsentralnyi Stadion, former name of Olimpiyskiy National Sports Complex, Kiev
Tsentralnyi Stadion, Starokostiantyniv

See also
 Central City Stadium (disambiguation)